Belle Isle Rice Mill Chimney  is a historic rice mill chimney and national historic district located near Georgetown, Georgetown County, South Carolina. The district encompasses one contributing site and four contributing structures. This rice mill chimney is one of seven known extant rice mill chimneys in Georgetown County and is associated with what once was one of several productive rice plantations on Cat Island. It is one of two extant rice mill chimneys in Georgetown County and measures 33 feet, 9 inches, high.

It was listed on the National Register of Historic Places in 1988.

References

Agricultural buildings and structures on the National Register of Historic Places in South Carolina
National Register of Historic Places in Georgetown County, South Carolina
Buildings and structures in Georgetown County, South Carolina
Historic districts on the National Register of Historic Places in South Carolina
Chimneys in the United States